Paul Rowney (born 2 December 1970 in Botany, Australia) is an Australian Olympic cyclist.

He placed 10th in the Men's Mountainbike Race at the 2000 Summer Olympics in Sydney, Australia. He has won three Australian championships in mountain biking. He was an Australian Institute of Sport scholarship holder. 

Rowney rode for the Yeti Cycles Factory Team and since retiring continues to act as their representative in Australia. 

He is the grandson of James Patterson, a former Australian champion in the 10 mile and Australian representative at the 1938 British Empire Games in the marathon.

References 

Olympic cyclists of Australia
Living people
Cyclists at the 2000 Summer Olympics
1970 births
Australian Institute of Sport cyclists
Cyclists from Sydney

Australian male cyclists